Nizhny Izyak (Tübänge İźäk; , Ülyl Üzek) is a rural locality (a village) in Izyaksky Selsoviet, Blagoveshchensky District, Bashkortostan, Russia. The population was 256 as of 2010. There are 6 streets.

Geography 
Nizhny Izyak is located 30 km southeast of Blagoveshchensk (the district's administrative centre) by road. Rafikovo is the nearest rural locality.

References 

Rural localities in Blagoveshchensky District